Mass protests and riots began in the Mongolian capital Ulaanbaatar on 4 December 2022. The reason for the protest was a corruption scandal involving the theft of $12.9 billion worth of coal.

Mongolian authorities had met with the protesters and promised to investigate the affairs. An investigation committee was announced by the Parliament and several officers suspected of coal theft were arrested. A public hearing is expected to be held on 21 December 2022. Mongolian authorities also announced plans to reform the mining firm Erdenes Tavaltogol to combat corruption.

Background 
Local media reported that the cause of civil discontent was the involvement of many politicians in the theft of export coal. According to unofficial data, about 6.5 million tons of coal were allegedly stolen from Mongolia. It is also noted that in China, those involved in the theft of coal from Mongolia were executed and sent a list with the names of Mongolian officials involved in this case. The protesters demanded that their names be announced. Khishgeegiin Nyambaatar, Minister of Justice and Internal Affairs of Mongolia, said that the government had applied through diplomatic channels to the Beijing authorities for cooperation with the Chinese prosecutor's office investigating the case of coal theft.

As noted, Mongolia exports up to 86 per cent of its goods to China, with more than half of this volume accounted for by coal. The value of coal exports from Mongolia jumped to $4.5 billion in the first 9 months of 2022.

Significant price discrepancies between coking coal sold in Mongolia (~$70 per ton), China (~$140 a ton) and the international market (~$300 per ton) are the main source of the alleged wrongdoing.

Protests

4 December 
Protesters gathered outside Ulaanbaatar's government palace on 4 December and demanded the names of officials who are said to have embezzled 44 trillion ($12.8 billion) in Mongolian tögrög (MNT) state coal export revenues over the past two years. Several protesters held national flags and placards "Stop robbing the people", and "Stop eating and thinking about my future". Several hundred demonstrators decided to continue the protest on Monday, saying they would "go all the way."

In the third largest Mongolian city, Darkhan, they also demanded that the names of the coal thieves be announced and that their property be confiscated. On Sunday, protesters marched through the city, chanting slogans including "Unite Against Thieves." The demonstrators believe that the rights and freedoms of citizens, enshrined in the Constitution, are increasingly limited, and their lives are deteriorating every day.

5 December 
On 5 December, protesters tried to break into the Government Palace in Ulaanbaatar. Christmas trees were burned at Sükhbaatar Square. Protesters briefly blocked the capital's main boulevard, Peace Avenue. The protesters also moved towards the residence of the Prime Minister, but the police blocked the road to it.

Mongolian authorities said they had created a working group to dialogue with the protesters.

It was reported that the government of Mongolia discussed the situation three times and introduced a "special regime" about the state-owned coal company Erdenes Tavantolgoy. The Minister of Economic Development named five former directors of the company as suspects in the theft of coal.

7 - 8 December 
Mongolian Prime Minister Luvsannamsrain Oyun-Erdene met with the protesters to try and calm public anger about the corruption. He admitted that stolen coal in Mongolia is "a public issue" and it would be resolved in "a more timely manner" "once and for all". He also called for national reconciliation underpinned by parliamentary democratic governance.

Mongolian Parliament Speaker Gombojav Zandanshatar announced the creation of a working group to investigate coal corruption. Parliament's Standing Committee on Economy approved the working group's proposal to have a public hearing which was decided to be held on 21 December, and within the 14-day preparation period, the working group was tasked to organise to collect opinions of citizens and involve witnesses and relevant officials. Relevant personnel were encouraged to testify and provide evidence to the legal authorities risking being criminally liable for concealing a crime.

On 8 December, Internal Affairs Minister Khishgeegiin Nyambaatar announced the arrest of several suspects in the coal theft affair, including Battulgyn Gankhuyag, a former executive director of Erdenes Tavan Tolgoi, his wife, sister, and son-in-law.

13 December 

Several hundred of protesters were reported to still gather at the city's central square to push for reforms and actions from the government.

Mongolia's Minister of Justice and Internal Affairs announced the plan to make Erdenes Tavan Tolgoi goes public to help drive out graft, claimed that "It is expected that this will end the problems of transparency in the mining sector and public officials' corruption." He added that all contracts signed by ETT have now been made public, details of the owners of 25,000 trucks involved in transporting ETT coal have also been disclosed. Mongolian authorities also planned to appoint a top international auditor to look into ETT's finances.

International reactions 
On 5 December, the US embassy in Mongolia responded to the protests by urging US citizens to avoid demonstrations and crowded places.

On 6 December, Chinese Foreign Ministry's spokesperson Mao Ning responded with regard to this incident, "As a friendly neighbor, China believes the government of Mongolia will properly probe and handle the incident. If Mongolia makes such a request, the competent authorities in China will provide necessary assistance in accordance with relevant laws and regulations."

Injuries 
Local media write that four police officers of the Government Palace were injured, and two protesters were injured in a crash during the assault. The authorities announced a forceful dispersal of the demonstration if protesters did not disperse by 22:00 local time.

References 

December 2022 events in Asia
Protests
Protests in Mongolia
Mongolia